The 2004 Hansol Korea Open was a women's tennis tournament and was held from September 27 – October 3, 2004, in Seoul, South Korea. It was a Tier-IV event on the 2004 WTA Tour. Maria Sharapova won the inaugural edition of the tournament.

Finals

Singles

 Maria Sharapova defeated  Marta Domachowska 6–1, 6–1

Doubles

 Cho Yoon-jeong /  Jeon Mi-ra defeated  Chuang Chia-jung /  Hsieh Su-wei 6–3, 1–6, 7–5

References

External links
 ITF tournament edition details

Hansol Korea Open
Korea Open (tennis)
Korea